Kwangjin Parkı, or Kwangjin Dostluk Parkı, is an urban recreational area in Ereğli district of Konya Province, Turkey. The park was established jointly by the municipalities of Ereğli and its South Korean sister city Gwangjin on 16 October 2002. In the inscription of the park it reads:
This part has been established within the scope of friendship and cooperation protocol of Kwangjin and Ereğli cities to evoke  the historical friendship between the Korean and Turkish nations eternally.
 (Signed by Yeung Sup Chung, mayor of Kwangjin and Aydın Selay mayor of Ereğli)

There is also a wedding-ceremony hall in the park. A summer house built in Korean style is situated at the center of the park.

References

External links
For images

Ereğli (Konya) District
Parks in Turkey
Buildings and structures in Konya Province